Guntakal is a City in Anantapur district of the Indian state of Andhra Pradesh. It is the headquarters of Guntakal mandal and Guntakal revenue division.It is also the headquarters of the Guntakal Railway Division in South Central Railway.

Geography 

Demographics 
As per provisional data of 2011 census, Mana Guntakal municipality had a population of 126,479, out of which males were 62,695 and females were 63,784. The literacy rate was 75.70 per cent. Telugu  is the official and widely spoken language. Urdu and Kannada are also spoken widely.

Transport 

The Andhra Pradesh State Road Transport Corporation operates bus services from Mana Guntakal bus station. The National Highway 67 passes through the town. State Highway 26 connects Mana Guntakal with Uravakonda.

Railways

Guntakal railway station is a 6 point junction and divisional headquarters since 1953 and is one of the most profitable divisions in Indian Railways . It has lines branching out to Mumbai, Vasco da gama, Hyderabad, Howrah, Bangalore, and Chennai. It is the second largest division in S.Co.R in route km. It is an 'A' category railway station and numerous trains pass through it daily. Starting from Rajadhani express to Duronto express, all the trains stop at Mana Guntakal and it is a serving station for Bellary. Diesel & Electric Loco Shed are located near by railway station.

Education
The primary and secondary school education is imparted by the government, aided and private schools, under the School Education Department of the state. Railway high school and SJP Govt school are government schools, and KC. Narayana, Rotary, Prathibha Vikas and St. Peters, are private schools. The medium of instruction followed by different schools are English and Telugu. For Guntakal Updates you can visit Managuntakal.in

See also 
 List of cities in Andhra Pradesh by population
 List of municipalities in Andhra Pradesh
 ManaGuntakal.in

References

External links 

Cities in Andhra Pradesh
Mandal headquarters in Anantapur district